Fábio Carleandro da Silva (born 28 February 1980) is a Brazilian former professional footballer who played as a defender.

Career
In late 2002, Fábio moved to Europe and joined First League of FR Yugoslavia side Rad. He spent three seasons with the Građevinari (the latter two in the Second League), before transferring to Red Star Belgrade in August 2005. In the first half of his debut season with the Crveno-beli, Fábio made two appearances in the Serbia and Montenegro Cup, but was deemed surplus to requirements during the winter break. He later went on loan to Rad and Napredak Kruševac.

In January 2008, Fábio returned to Brazil and signed with Náutico. He subsequently played for his former club Rio Branco-AC. In August 2009, Fábio was signed by Major League Soccer side San Jose Earthquakes, but was let go the next month.

After returning to Brazil, Fábio played for União Rondonópolis, Cerâmica, Goianésia, CRAC-GO, Trindade and Central.

References

External links
 
 
 

Association football defenders
Brazilian expatriate footballers
Brazilian expatriate sportspeople in Serbia
Brazilian expatriate sportspeople in Serbia and Montenegro
Brazilian expatriate sportspeople in the United States
Brazilian footballers
Campeonato Brasileiro Série C players
Campeonato Brasileiro Série D players
Campinense Clube players
Central Sport Club players
Cerâmica Atlético Clube players
Clube Náutico Capibaribe players
Clube Recreativo e Atlético Catalano players
Expatriate footballers in Serbia
Expatriate footballers in Serbia and Montenegro
Expatriate soccer players in the United States
First League of Serbia and Montenegro players
FK Napredak Kruševac players
FK Rad players
Goianésia Esporte Clube players
Red Star Belgrade footballers
Rio Branco Football Club players
San Jose Earthquakes players
Serbian First League players
Serbian SuperLiga players
Treze Futebol Clube players
Trindade Atlético Clube players
1980 births
Living people
União Esporte Clube players